John Watson,  D.D. was a priest and academic in the late fifteenth and early sixteenth centuries.

Watson was educated at Christ's College, Cambridge, graduating B.A. in 1498; MA in 1501; and B.D. in 1513. He held livings at Elsworth, White Notley and St Mary Woolnoth in the City of London. He was Fellow of Christ's from 1501 to 1516; and Master of Christ's from 1517 to 1531. He was twice Vice Chancellor of the University of Cambridge: from 1518 to 1520, and from 1530 to 1532.

He died in March 1537.

References 

Alumni of Christ's College, Cambridge
Fellows of Christ's College, Cambridge
Masters of Christ's College, Cambridge
Vice-Chancellors of the University of Cambridge
1537 deaths